Stefan Kehrer (born January 18, 1985 in Mannheim, Baden-Württemberg) is an amateur German freestyle wrestler, who played for the men's heavyweight category. He won a bronze medal for his division at the 2006 European Wrestling Championships in Moscow, Russia.

Kehrer represented Germany at the 2008 Summer Olympics in Beijing, where he competed for the men's 96 kg class. He received a bye for the preliminary round of sixteen match, before losing out to Turkey's Hakan Koç, who was able to score one point each in two straight periods, leaving Kehrer with a single point.

References

External links
Profile – International Wrestling Database
NBC 2008 Olympics profile

1985 births
Living people
Olympic wrestlers of Germany
Wrestlers at the 2008 Summer Olympics
Sportspeople from Mannheim
German male sport wrestlers
21st-century German people